Jagged Edge, also known as Jagged Edge UK in the United States where there is an American R&B vocal group with the same name, were a glam metal/rock band formed in London in 1985 by Myke Gray, former guitarist of the band Dorian Gray and briefly of UFO, and bassist/vocalist Billy Kulke.

History
Formed in 1985. the band went through numerous line-up changes before a somewhat stable line-up emerged. This line-up consisted of Gray, rhythm section of bassist/vocalist Billy Kulke (current Letz Zep frontman), and later Di´Anno/Killers drummer Steve Hopgood along with ex-Baby Tuckoo and Accept vocalist Rob Armitage. The band toured with Ozzy Osbourne in the UK during June and July 1988.

However, this line-up split before the band was signed to Polydor Records, and the band's first EP, as well as the album Fuel for Your Soul, was recorded by the 1989 line-up of Gray, Swedish vocalist Matt Alfonzetti (ex-Bam Bam Boys), bassist Andy Robbins (ex-Tokyo Blade and Shogun), and Italian drummer Fabio Del Rio (who, incidentally, was a member of UFO shortly after Gray's brief tenure). The line-up also included keyboardist Dave Rosingana who performed with Flashpoint, another rock band (not the Miami jazz ensemble).

After touring for the album, Polydor dropped the band, which then split up. They played their last show in Dudley on 14 July 1991 and the members moved on to other projects. Gray started a successful career as studio musician and songwriter, including co-writing the Right Said Fred hit, "You're My Mate", and performing under the handle of Sickboy. Alfonzetti and Gray have started playing together again in the band Red, White and Blues which released an album titled Shine.

Founder member Billy Kulke went on to form a melodic rock band called First Strike along with ex-Samson vocalist Mick White. The band toured extensively from 1989 to their disbanding in 1992. They toured with Giant, Uriah Heep, Slaughter and Dare to name a few. They released one album entitled 'Just Another Night' via Steelheart Records

Personnel

Discography

Studio albums
 Fuel for Your Soul (1990)

Extended plays
 Trouble (1989)

References

English glam metal musical groups
English hard rock musical groups
Musical groups established in 1987
Musical groups disestablished in 1991
Musical groups from London